This is a bibliography of Aleksandr Solzhenitsyn's works.

Books 

 (Cancer Ward)
 (The First Circle)

 (Collected Works)
 (August 1914)

 (The Oak and the Calf, autobiography)

 .

 .

 (Lenin in Zurich - Petrograd)
 .

Editions and collections 

 , .

English editions 

 (contains An Incident at Krechetovka Station and Matryona's Place)

Uncollected periodical publications

Other works 

Translation: 

The Smatterers, a 1974 essay

References 

Solzhenitsyn Studies: A Quarterly Review 1–2 (1980–1981). 

Bibliographies by writer
Bibliographies of Russian writers
Christian bibliographies